Boerebach is a surname. Notable people with the surname include:

Michel Boerebach (born 1963), Dutch footballer
Mark Boerebach, Australian savant